The 2023 Cologne Centurions season is going to be the third season of the Cologne Centurions team in the European League of Football after a previous season with mixed results and a 3–9 standing.

Preseason
The first changes for the franchise were in the coaching staff with the departure of Frank Roser as head coach. Shortly after Khalil Carter was announced as new head coach, marking him as the third head coach in the three year history of the franchise to date.

Regular season

Standings

Roster

Transactions
From Istanbul Rams: Zachary Blair (November 9, 2022), Kris Wedderburn (December 13, 2022), Terryon Robinson (December 22, 2022)
From Hamburg Sea Devils: Gerald Ameln (December 16, 2022)

Staff

Notes

References 

Cologne Centurions (ELF) seasons
Cologne Centurions
Cologne Centurions